SeaKeys is a large collaborative marine biodiversity project funded through the Foundational Biodiversity Information Program in South Africa. The purpose of the project is to collect and distribute genetic, species and ecosystem information relating to marine biodiversity in southern Africa, which may be used to support informed decision-making about the marine environment.

Purpose
The aim of the project is to collect and make available genetic, species and ecosystem information about Southern African marine biodiversity. This information is expected to be useful to support conservation planning to inform decisions regarding exploitation of marine resources.

DNA barcoding
There is a known deficit in marine and coastal biodiversity databases for most taxa in South Africa. SeaKeys is part of an effort to change this. A part of the project is to use DNA barcoding of common, invasive, commercially important, rare and endangered marine species to aid estimating species diversity and distributions. The barcodes are accessible through the Barcode of Life Database

History
The project public launch was held at the Iziko South Africa Museum on 18 March 2014.

Management
The SeaKeys project is managed though the South African National Biodiversity Institute marine programme under Dr Kerry Sink.

Research partners

Citizen science input
The citizen science component is a major input for several new biodiversity atlas projects. There are species mapping subprojects which include a fish atlas, a sea slug atlas, an atlas for corals, seafans and anemones, one for jellyfish and an atlas for echinoderms. Citizen science input is largely by way of entering observations supported by an identifiable photograph of the observed organism, along with details of date, location, tentative identification and other information on any one of the web-based platforms associated with the project.

The project uses three web-based platforms to collect marine species observations. SA Jellywatch  i-Spot and EchinoMAP  (using Google Earth maps or GPS co-ordinates) to create detailed distributions of South African marine species.

Crowdsourced data is provided largely by recreational scuba divers and recreational angling clubs, but a large amount of data is also provided by professional scientists from field observations. A small percentage is sourced from historical photographs, mostly of fish.

Platforms:
iSpot hosted by the Open University, and Echinomap at the University of Cape Town allow for uploading of photographs of marine organisms along with date and locality information.
SA Jellywatch at University of the Western Cape records public participation in tracking jellyfish distributions and abundance.
Most of the data on iSpot was later migrated to iNaturalist when iSpot was found to be unsuitable for the purpose.

Funding
SeaKeys is funded by the National Research Foundation of South Africa through the Foundational Biodiversity Information Programme.

References

Marine biodiversity of South Africa
Citizen science